The Millennium Collection: The Best of Kiss is a compilation album that collects the 1970s output by the American rock band Kiss. It was released by Universal Music as part of their 20th Century Masters - The Millennium Collection series. It is the first of a trilogy of albums in the Millennium Collection series featuring material from Kiss. The second volume, which covers material from the 1980s output was released in 2004, followed by the 1990s output third installment in 2006.

This collection was later re-released in 2010 as Icon, as part of Universal Music's Icon series. This collection was then yet again re-re-released in a collection known as "Playlist...Plus", a three-CD compilation consisting all three volumes of the Kiss Millennium Collection.
This album has been certified Gold, the band's 30th gold album.

Track listing

Personnel
Kiss
Paul Stanley – vocals, rhythm guitar, intro guitar solo on "C'mon and Love Me", 12-string acoustic guitar on "Hard Luck Woman"; bass on "Love Gun" and "I Was Made for Lovin' You"
Gene Simmons – vocals, bass; rhythm guitar on "Christine Sixteen"
Peter Criss – drums, vocals
Ace Frehley – lead guitar, acoustic guitar on "Hard Luck Woman", backing vocals

Additional musicians
Anton Fig – drums on "I Was Made for Lovin' You"
Vini Poncia – keyboards and backing vocals on "I Was Made for Lovin' You"
Bob Ezrin – piano on "Beth"
Dick Wagner – acoustic guitar on "Beth"
Eddie Kramer – keyboards on "Love Gun" and "Christine Sixteen"

References

External links
Official website

Kiss
Kiss (band) compilation albums
2003 greatest hits albums
Mercury Records compilation albums
Universal Music Group compilation albums